The Christian National Union, abbreviated to ZChN, was a Polish nationalist political party in Poland.  Founded on 15 September 1989, the party traced its tradition to the Solidarity movement, as well as pre-war National Democracy and Polish Christian Democratic Party.

The party adhered to the Christian right, advocating social conservatism.  From its foundation until 1994, the party was led by Wiesław Chrzanowski, who was Marshal of the Sejm until 1993.  The ZChN founded the Alliance for Poland with the Centre Alliance.  The party joined the larger centre-right Solidarity Electoral Action, and remained as one of four parties in the organisation when it was reformed in December 2000.  It continued as a mass membership organisation, with 10,000 members in 2004.

In 2007, most ZChN politicians joined League of Polish Families.

Today both PiS and the National Movement (RN) claim to be successors of the organization. PiS has most of the support of previous members of the Christian National Union however the RN has adopted most of its policies and declares itself the modern day version of the National Democracy movement.

Party presidents
 Wiesław Chrzanowski (1989–1994)
 Ryszard Czarnecki (1994–1996)
 Marian Piłka (1996–2000)
 Stanisław Zając (2000–2002)
 Jerzy Kropiwnicki (2002–2006)
 Jacek Szczot (2006–2007)
 Marian Papis

Electoral results

Sejm

Senate

Footnotes

References

1989 establishments in Poland
2010 disestablishments in Poland
Catholic political parties
Christian democratic parties in Europe
Conservative parties in Poland
Defunct political parties in Poland
Libertas.eu
National conservative parties
National Democracy
Nationalist parties in Poland
Polish nationalist parties
Political parties disestablished in 2010
Political parties established in 1989
Right-wing parties in Europe